
Gmina Barwice is an urban-rural gmina (administrative district) in Szczecinek County, West Pomeranian Voivodeship, in north-western Poland.

The gmina contains part of the protected area called Drawsko Landscape Park.

Villages
Apart from the town of Barwice, Gmina Barwice contains the villages and settlements of Bącki, Białowąs, Borzęcino, Brzeźno, Chłopówko, Chłopowo, Chwalimka, Chwalimki, Cybulino, Dobrzycko, Gąski, Gonne Małe, Górki, Grabiążek, Gwiazdowo, Jadwigowo, Jagielnik, Jeziorki, Kaźmierzewo, Kłodzino, Knyki, Kobacz, Kobuz, Kołątek, Kolonia Łęknica, Kolonia Przybkowo, Kolonia Sulikowo, Koprzywienko, Koprzywno, Korzec, Krzyka, Krzywolas, Łęknica, Liwiec, Luboradza, Lubostronie, Niemierzyno, Nowa Łęknica, Nowe Koprzywno, Nowy Chwalim, Nowy Grabiąż, Ostropole, Ostrowąsy, Parchlino, Piaski, Polne, Przybkówko, Smaga, Śmilcz, Stare Koprzywno, Stary Chwalim, Stary Grabiąż, Sulikowo, Świerk, Tarmno, Trzemienko, Uradz, Weje, Wojsławiec, Żdżar and Żytnik.

Neighbouring gminas
Gmina Barwice is bordered by the gminas of Borne Sulinowo, Czaplinek, Grzmiąca, Połczyn-Zdrój, Szczecinek and Tychowo.

References
Polish official population figures 2006

Barwice
Szczecinek County